Trinity School at Meadow View is a private, Blue Ribbon Award-winning Christian school in Falls Church, Virginia.  It was founded in 1998 by the People of Praise and provides classical Christian education to students in grades 7-12.  Since then it has developed a strong educational presence in Northern Virginia and attracts international students. It is accredited by the Virginia Association of Independent Schools (VAIS).

The Meadow View campus has two sister schools, Greenlawn and River Ridge.  The schools are independent and are owned and operated by Trinity Schools, Inc.

Faculty 
Mr. Jon Balsbaugh serves the president of Trinity Schools, Inc.  Kay Yohe is Head of School at the Meadow View campus.  Timothy Maloney is the Associate Head of School.  Scott Niklason is Dean of Boys and Elizabeth Tehrani is the Dean of Girls. Trinity School at Meadow View employs faculty with degrees from the University of Oxford, Princeton University, University of Chicago, Georgetown University, Hillsdale College and other leading institutions.

Classes 
Students at Trinity School at Meadow View take a variety classes lauded by the United States Department of Education, including a 6-year writing course and a 4-year Latin course.  The curriculum focuses on primary source material and small class sizes with dedicated, personal instruction from highly educated teachers.  Students who complete the full six-year program also graduate with four years of music, art and theater.

Athletics 
In 2002 the Men’s Varsity Basketball team won the First Annual Wakefield Holiday Tournament, led by Junior Forward Josiah Brand, who won the MVP of the Tournament, and Nicky Bell.

Facilities

External links and references
Map: 
Trinity Schools at Meadow View web site
Trinity Schools web site
People of Praise web site

Christian schools in Virginia
Classical Christian schools
Private high schools in Virginia
Private middle schools in Virginia
Trinity Schools
Schools in Falls Church, Virginia